Potanin is a Russian surname. Notable people with the surname include:

 Grigory Potanin (1835–1920), Russian explorer
 Vladimir Potanin (born 1961), Russian businessman

See also
 9915 Potanin, asteroid
 Potanin Glacier, the longest glacier in Mongolia, named for Grigory Potanin

Russian-language surnames